Robert Challenor (25 June 1884 – 26 June 1977) was a Barbadian cricketer. He played in thirteen first-class matches for the Barbados cricket team from 1904 to 1925.

See also
 List of Barbadian representative cricketers

References

External links
 

1884 births
1977 deaths
Barbadian cricketers
Barbados cricketers
People from Saint Michael, Barbados